Lourdes Teodoro (born 4 June 1946) is an Afro-Brazilian academic, writer, poet, and psychoanalyst who studies the effects of colonization on identity.

Biography
Maria de Lourdes Teodoro was born on 4 June 1946 in Vila Couros, Goiás, Brazil. In 1958, with the founding of Brasilia, her family relocated there, where she completed her secondary education. From her youth, she began publishing poems in student journals and newspapers, including Correio Braziliense, and with a group of other students published the Antologia de Alunos Escritores do Elefante Branco (Anthology of Student Writers of the White Elephant) in 1966. After graduating from the University of Brasília with a degree in literature, she began teaching French and Literature at Centro Universitário de Brasília. In 1980, she began work on a doctorate at University of Paris III: Sorbonne Nouvelle in Paris on Comparative Literature, graduating in 1984 with a dissertation entitled Identités antillaise et brésilienne à travers les oeuvres d'Aimé Césaire et de Mario de Andrade (Antillian and Brazilian identities through the works of Aimé Césaire and Mário de Andrade). The work, like many of her tracts, evaluates the effects of slavery and racism on Afro-Brazilians.

After returning to Brazil, Teodoro taught as an adjunct Professor at the Arts Institute of the University of Brasilia. In 1991 she began offering lectures in Africa, participating in seminars in Angola and Senegal. She helped with the founding of the Institute of Black Peoples in Burkino Faso,  before moving to the United States. In 1996 Teodoro began graduate studies at Harvard University in African-American studies and psychoanalysis, which she completed in 1998. Her post-doctoral internship in childhood and adolescence psychopathology was completed at the psychiatry clinic of the University Hospital of Brasilia.

Teodoro currently conducts academic research at the Instituto de Pesquisas e Estudos Afro-brasileiras (Institute for Research and Afro Brazilian Studies) in Rio de Janeiro and is practicing psychoanalyst. She is a member of the International Psychoanalytical Association and an associate member of the Brasilia Psychoanalytic Society.

Selected works
 with Heleno, Guido, Carlos Pontes, Reginaldo Fontele, et al., 

with Bruce, Iain,  Also in Margaret Busby (ed.), Daughters of Africa, London: Jonathan Cape, 1992, pp. 281–283, . 

 Identidade Cultural e Diversidade Étnica – Négritude Africano-Antilhana e Modernismo Brasileiro (in Portuguese). Scortecci Editora, 2015. .
 Identidades Culturais e Négritude Antilhana: Prática em Literatura Compartilhada (in Portuguese). Scortecci Editora, 2015. .

References

Citations

Sources

External links 
 WorldCat publications

1946 births
Living people
Academic staff of the University of Brasília
Psychoanalysts
Afro-Brazilian women
20th-century Brazilian women writers
21st-century Brazilian women writers
21st-century Brazilian writers
University of Paris alumni
Harvard University alumni
Brazilian women poets
20th-century Brazilian poets